LunIR is a nanosatellite spacecraft launched to the Moon collecting surface spectroscopy and thermography. It was launched as a secondary payload on the Artemis 1 mission on 16 November 2022.

Mission 
LunIR is a technology demonstration mission funded by NASA that uses a low-cost 6U CubeSat spacecraft. LunIR will perform a lunar flyby, collecting spectroscopy and thermography for surface characterization, remote sensing, and site selection.

LunIR was selected in April 2015 by NASA's NextSTEP program (Next Space Technologies for Exploration Partnerships) and awarded a contract to Lockheed Martin Space worth US$1.4 million for further development.

LunIR will communicate with Earth via ground stations operated by Kongsberg Satellite Services. LunIR will use 13-meter-diameter radio antennas located in Punta Arenas, Chile; Svalbard, Norway; and Troll station, Antarctica.

Launch 
LunIR was launched as one of ten CubeSats as a secondary payload on the maiden flight of the Space Launch System, Artemis 1.

Propulsion 
LunIR will demonstrate a low thrust electric propulsion technology called electrospray propulsion to lower the spacecraft's orbit for additional science and technology mission objectives.

See also 

The 10 CubeSats flying in the Artemis 1 mission
 Near-Earth Asteroid Scout by NASA was a solar sail spacecraft that was planned to encounter a near-Earth asteroid (mission failure)
 BioSentinel is an astrobiology mission
 LunIR by Lockheed Martin Space
 Lunar IceCube, by the Morehead State University
 CubeSat for Solar Particles (CuSP)
 Lunar Polar Hydrogen Mapper (LunaH-Map), designed by the Arizona State University
 EQUULEUS, submitted by JAXA and the University of Tokyo
 OMOTENASHI, submitted by JAXA, was a lunar lander (mission failure)
 ArgoMoon, designed by Argotec and coordinated by Italian Space Agency (ASI)
 Team Miles, by Fluid and Reason LLC, Tampa, Florida

The three CubeSat missions removed from Artemis 1
 Lunar Flashlight will map exposed water ice on the Moon
 Cislunar Explorers, Cornell University, Ithaca, New York
 Earth Escape Explorer (CU-E3), University of Colorado Boulder

References 

CubeSats
Missions to the Moon
NASA space probes
2022 in the United States
Space probes launched in 2022
Secondary payloads
Satellites orbiting the Moon